Sultan Duzelbayev (born 12 March 1994) is a male Kazakh recurve archer from Almaty. He competed in the archery competition at the 2016 Summer Olympics in Rio de Janeiro.

References

External links
 

Kazakhstani male archers
Living people
1994 births
Sportspeople from Almaty
Archers at the 2016 Summer Olympics
Olympic archers of Kazakhstan
Archers at the 2018 Asian Games
Asian Games competitors for Kazakhstan
21st-century Kazakhstani people